Li Fei may refer to:

 Consort Li (disambiguation), various consorts of Chinese rulers
 Li Fei (rower) (born 1973), Chinese Olympic rower
 Li Fei (sailor) (born 1983), Chinese sports sailor
 Li Fei (footballer) (born 1983), Chinese football player
 Li Fei (wushu) (born 1975), Chinese wushu athlete and actor in Macau
 Ping Hsin-tao, who used the pen name Fei Li